Johann Jakob Dorner may refer to:

 Johann Jakob Dorner the Elder (1741–1813), German painter
 Johann Jakob Dorner the Younger (1775–1852), German painter